The Men's alpine combined competition at the FIS Alpine World Ski Championships 2021 was scheduled for 10 February, but was postponed to 15 February 2021.

Results
The super-G was started at 11:15, and the slalom at 15:20.

References

Men's alpine combined